Lieutenant Colonel Douglas Charles Robinson was British army officer and a first-class cricketer who captained Gloucestershire. He also played for Essex, Marylebone Cricket Club and for the amateur Gentlemen and England XI teams.

Family and cricket
Robinson was born in 1883 at Lawrence Weston House near Bristol, and educated at Marlborough College.  His father was Gloucestershire player Arthur Robinson and his grandfather was Elisha Smith Robinson. Many of his relations were prominent cricketers.

Military career 
He attended the Royal Military Academy Sandhurst and was commissioned as a Second lieutenant in the 3rd (militia) Battalion, the Gloucestershire Regiment on 19 March 1902. He fought in World War I with  the King's Own Royal Regiment (Lancaster), and became a lieutenant-colonel.

He later bred cows at Ham Court Farm near Cheltenham and died there in 1963.

References
Notes

Sources

1880s births
1963 deaths
English cricketers
Gloucestershire cricketers
Essex cricketers
Gentlemen cricketers
British Army cricketers
Non-international England cricketers
Army and Navy cricketers
Marylebone Cricket Club cricketers
Graduates of the Royal Military College, Sandhurst
People educated at Marlborough College
Gentlemen of England cricketers
Cricketers from Bristol
English cricketers of 1919 to 1945
British Army personnel of World War I
King's Own Royal Regiment officers
Military personnel from Bristol
Wicket-keepers